Jayme Monjardim Matarazzo Filho (born November 20, 1985) is a Brazilian actor. He is descended from the Matarazzo Family, grandson of André and Maysa Matarazzo, and son of TV and film director Jayme Monjardim with Fernanda Lauer.

Biography
Jayme Matarazzo was born in Rio de Janeiro. He moved to São Paulo aged five years old with his mother, Fernanda Lauer, and his sister, Maria Fernanda Matarazzo, where he lived until the age of 21.

At 16, Jayme formed the band Seu Bené e os Poetas da Malandragem (Sir Bené and The Poets of Malandragem) with some school friends. At 20, he moved to California where lived for four months. The actor worked in a ski resort and doing shows in a casino. Upon returning to Brazil entered the film school Fundação Armando Alvares Penteado (FAAP), São Paulo, but he did not complete the course, as he moved to Rio de Janeiro to work with his father.

Personal life
Jayme had a three-year relationship with the architect Mila Barbosa. The couple broke up in September 2010.

Career
At 21 years old, Jayme moved to Rio de Janeiro to work with his father as assistant director in the miniseries Maysa: Quando Fala o Coração. At that time he wanted to dedicate the same career his father's art direction. But when he was working on the miniseries, which tells the life of his paternal grandmother, had his first opportunity as an actor. Jayme represented his father when young. Given this new experience, he decided to pursue an artistic career. In 2010, he worked on the novel of Rede Globo, Escrito nas Estrelas as protagonist and in the film A Suprema Felicidade directed by Arnaldo Jabor. Jayme Matarazzo also played the young Prince Felipe in the telenovela Cordel Encantado.

Filmography

Television

Film

Music videos

See also
List of Brazilian actors

References

1985 births
Living people
Male actors from Rio de Janeiro (city)
Brazilian people of Italian descent
Brazilian male telenovela actors
Brazilian male film actors